Jaya Ojha is an Indian actress and singer known for her work in Indian soap operas. She is known for her role as Mandodari in the 2000s epic TV series Ramayan. She played a supporting role in the long-running soap opera Saath Nibhaana Saathiya on channel Star Plus. She played the role of Malti in Badho Bahu.

Career
Jaya went to school in Jaipur and during her studies, she developed an interest in music and acting. She completed her Masters in Hindustani vocal music. While completing her studies in the early 1990s, she worked in a number of TV shows, including The Sword of Tipu Sultan and The Great Maratha, as well as performing in theatre. 
After getting married, she moved to Mumbai and took a break from her professional career in order to focus on her family. She made a comeback in 2005 and joined a theatre group called Yatri and continued to work on more stage projects. She then progressed to television, and was signed for shows like Lucky and Kumkum. Her first breakthrough roles were playing Mandodari in the epic drama Ramayan, and a major role in the sitcom Angrezi Mein Kehte Hain. In 2013, she joined the long-running soap opera Saath Nibhaana Saathiya, where she held the supporting role of Madhu. Her recent work was in &TV's popular sitcom Badho Bahu.

Filmography

References

External links
 

Living people
Year of birth missing (living people)
20th-century births
Indian Gorkhas
People from Sri Ganganagar
Actresses from Rajasthan
Actresses from Mumbai
20th-century Indian actresses
21st-century Indian actresses
Indian film actresses
Indian stage actresses
Indian television actresses
Indian soap opera actresses
Actresses in Hindi television
Actresses in Hindi cinema
Indian women screenwriters
Nepalese lyricists